Sue Thompson (born Eva Sue McKee; July 19, 1925 – September 23, 2021) was an American pop and country music singer.  
 
She was best known for the million selling hits "Sad Movies (Make Me Cry)" and "Norman" in 1961, "James (Hold The Ladder Steady)" in 1962 and her 1965 hit "Paper Tiger".

Early life
Thompson was born in Nevada, Missouri in July 1925. By the age of 7, she was singing and playing the guitar on stage.  She later moved with her family to live in San Jose, California.

During World War II, she worked at a defense plant.  She married when she was 17, and had a daughter at 20, but the marriage failed and she and her husband split up after three years. To keep supporting herself after her divorce, she returned to the nightclub scene in California, now using the name Sue Thompson. In San Jose, she won a talent contest, thus catching the attention of a bandleader and radio/TV host named Dude Martin (real name John Stephen McSwain), who invited her to sing with his band. This led to their marriage. They recorded duets together, including "If You Want Some Lovin'", which helped her get a solo contract from Mercury Records in 1950.  She released numerous singles on Mercury between 1951 and 1954, with no chart action.

Recording career
Within a year, she divorced Martin, and married Hank Penny, a comedian and singer, in 1953.  Penny and Thompson hosted a TV show in Los Angeles together before eventually moving to Las Vegas. After her contract with Mercury ended, Thompson recorded for Decca Records from 1954–57, again without a commercial breaktrhough.   Thompson and Penny had a son, Greg Penny, but divorced in 1963.

In 1960, Thompson signed on with Columbia Records, who renamed the singer "Taffy Thomas" and issued one non-charting single under this artist name.  Thereafter, the Taffy Thomas moniker was quickly dropped, and Thompson signed with Hickory Records. In 1961, after having issued over a dozen non-charting singles in a decade-long recording career, Thompson's "Sad Movies (Make Me Cry)" became a No. 5 hit on the pop charts.  She followed this up successfully with "Norman," which reached No. 3. Both of these hit singles were written by songwriter John D. Loudermilk. They both sold over one million copies, and were awarded gold discs. Both were also chart successes in Australia, reaching #3 and #8 respectively.

In 1962, "Have a Good Time" was a Top 40 hit and in 1963, "Willie Can" was a minor hit.  Her early 1960s' hits made Thompson, then in her late-thirties but with a much younger-sounding voice, a favorite among the teenage crowd and briefly a rival to the much younger Connie Francis and Brenda Lee. Two additional hits, also written by Loudermilk, were "James (Hold the Ladder Steady)" and "Paper Tiger."   The latter song, in 1965, was her last Top 30 hit, and her biggest hit in Britain and in Australia, where it reached #3.

Later career
In the late 1960s, she went back to country music and released the album This Is Sue Thompson Country in 1969. In 1971 she worked with country music singer Don Gibson on some albums, and they had minor hits with "I Think They Call It Love", "Good Old Fashioned Country Love", and "Oh, How Love Changes". She recorded further solo singles for the country charts, like "Big Mable Murphy", which made the Top 50 in 1975 and "Never Naughty Rosie", her last chart single in 1976. She also performed mainly at the Las Vegas casinos and at clubs in Hollywood, like the Palomino Club. In the 1990s, she settled in Las Vegas, and continued to periodically perform.

She also appeared on American Bandstand, Where the Action Is, The Buddy Deane Show, and The Lloyd Thaxton Show (1966 visit and performance of "Paper Tiger").

In 2009 Thompson's son, record producer Greg Penny, recorded her acoustic cover of her favourite song, the 1952 hit "You Belong to Me". The demo was given its radio premiere during her 2010 interview on the South Australian radio show "The Doo Wop Corner" by Carmen Kaye.

Death
Sue Thompson died at her daughter's home in Pahrump, Nevada, on September 23, 2021, at the age of 96.

Discography

Albums

Singles

A"Paper Tiger" peaked at No. 8 on the RPM Top Singles chart in Canada.

Singles with Don Gibson

References

External links
 [ Sue Thompson Discography at Allmusic]
 
 

1925 births
2021 deaths
American country singer-songwriters
American women country singers
American women pop singers
Columbia Records artists
Country musicians from Missouri
Decca Records artists
Hickory Records artists
Mercury Records artists
People from Nevada, Missouri
Singer-songwriters from Missouri
21st-century American women